Winston Reedy (born 13 July 1950, Saint Catherine Parish, Jamaica, West Indies) is a Jamaican reggae singer. Previously vocalist for the Cimarons from 1970, he is best known as a lovers rock vocalist with hits such as "Paradise in Your Eyes", "Moi Emma Oh" and, in particular, "Dim The Lights" (1983), which saw Reid crowned as Britain's best reggae singer three years in a row after he went solo.

Reed appeared alongside Janet Kay, and others on 31 December 2005, at the 'New Year's Eve Gala – Lovers Rock' event at The Banqueting Hall, Station Road, Brixton.

In 2008, a long association with Jet Star Records culminated in the release of the Patrick Donegan-produced, Reality, on their Charm imprint.

In 2012, Reedy performed at the Respect Jamaica 50 series of concerts as part of a deejay special alongside U Roy, Yellowman and Tappa Zukie, celebrating Jamaican independence day.

Albums
Dim the Light (1983)
Crossover (1985)
Love Affair
Reality (2008)
Lips And Chalis (2010)
Make A Change (2012)
Badaration (2013)

Compilations
Love Light: The Best Of
Gold (1994)
Love Thing (2005)
Mother Earth (2008)

References

External links
Discogs entry

Living people
Lovers rock musicians
British male singers
British reggae musicians
1950 births